Julio Emilio Suárez Sedraschi (born September 16, 1909 in Salto, died on August 15, 1965 in Montevideo) was a Uruguayan caricature artist, journalist, and comic book artist.

Biography 
Julio E. Suárez was one of the pioneers of comic strips in Uruguay.  Born in Salto, Uruguay, he traveled to Montevideo to study architecture in 1927, but he quickly abandoned his studies. In that time he began career with newspapers and his relationship with the short-lived Uruguayan newspaper, El Nacional, where he published parliamentary notes. He published his first drawings (Wing y Roncadera) in "El Plata", before he moved to the magazine "Mundo Uruguayo" in 1934 where he published two series of drawings, “Ríase o no” (laugh or not) and “Contra-refranes” (contradictions). He worked with Mundo until 1950.

Along with his work as an illustrator, he wrote scripts starring his character "Peloduro" for the radio broadcast station CX 24 in Montevideo and became an illustration teacher in the school of applied arts. He also created the character “Marieta Caramba” voiced by actress Jebele Sand on CX 30 Radio Nacional.

Throughout his career he used various pseudonyms among them “pelo”, “Marcos Tuáin” “Pepe Repepe” and “El Mono”. However, his most widely used names were “JESS” and “peloduro”.

He died in 1965.

Homages 
Since 1996 el Museo de Humor y la Historieta, (Comic and Humor Museum), in the city of Minas (Comic and Humor Museum), Uruguay which was founded in 1992, carries his name, as well as a street in Montevideo. The museum also issues a "Peloduro" award.

In 1967 after his death, two compilations of his works were published “Diccionario del Disparate” and “Comentarios internacionales de “El Pulga”.

Since 2011 Uruguay celebrates Día de la Historieta on September 16 in honor of Suárez's birthday.

References

References from Spanish article not cited in English article 
http://auchistorietas.blogspot.com/2011/07/dia-nacional-del-historietista.html
Multiverseros.com 'Por segundo año consecutivo, el 16 de setiembre será el DÍA DE LA HISTORIETA URUGUAYA'
http://www.ivoox.com/nota-con-nicolas-peruzzo-auch-sobre-el-dia-audios-mp3_rf_1434114_1.html
«Autores del Uruguay»
Junta Departamental de Montevideo (24/09/09)."Intervención en recuerdo de Peloduro"».
http://www.ivoox.com/nota-con-nicolas-peruzzo-auch-sobre-el-dia-audios-mp3_rf_1434114_1.html
Castellanos, Alfredo C. (2000). «Nomenclatura de Montevideo»
Comedia Nacional. «"Peloduro, padre del humorismo uruguayo".».

Uruguayan comics artists
1909 births
1965 deaths
Uruguayan caricaturists
Uruguayan cartoonists
Uruguayan journalists
Uruguayan radio presenters
20th-century Uruguayan painters
Uruguayan male artists
Male painters
20th-century Uruguayan male artists
20th-century journalists